Mineral salts pyridine broth is a selective medium for bacteria that can metabolize pyridine (which is an unusual carbon source that a select few types of bacteria can use). This medium is used to isolate bacteria belonging to the genus Arthrobacter among other bacteria genera.

References

 

Cell culture media